The Buckeye Politicians were a funk rock band that released some recordings in the 1970s.

History
The group formed in the very early 1970s by three brothers who once called themselves "The Vondors." They recorded a single for Bill Moss' Holiday records. Side A was a vocal track while the B side was instrumental. Through Moss' connections with Bell Records, two more singles were released on the Bell label. They changed their name to The Soul Partners and scored a local hit.

They changed their name in the 1970s to The Buckeye Politicians and released a single on Sceptor Records.

Later, the band traveled to England and recorded under the direction of Alan Parsons, producing one single. An album worth of material from the Alan Parsons sessions was recorded. However, the album was never released because the tapes were lost by the airline on their return to the United States.

They released a single and an album on Utopia records. They released a few more singles in the 1980s.

As part of a 2006 reunion they recorded a CD called Here I Am.

Original member Larry "LA" Almon died in 2008.

Members

Original
 LA (Larry) Almon - Lead and Rhythm Guitar, Vocals
 Jay Almon - Bass Guitar: Vocals
 Roscoe Almon - Guitar, Lead and vocals
 Bobby Marsillio - Trumpet
 Buzzard - Drums
 Dog - Trombone, keyboards & flute

Current
 LA Almon - Lead and Rhythm Guitar, Vocals
 Jay Almon - Bass Guitar: Vocals
 Conia (sonya with a C) Almon - Vocals: (Jay Almon's daughter)
 Tharon Johnson - Keyboards
 David Nilo - Keyboards
 Mark Henderson - Percussion
 Kris Keith - Tenor and Soprano Saxophone, Flute

US discography

7" singles
 "Girl I Could Love You More" / "I Wish It Would Rain" - Scepter Records SCE-12301 - 1970 
 "Dreams" / "Sister Rose" - EMI 2134 - 1974

12" singles
 "Ride On The Rhythm" / "Ride On The Rhythm" (Instrumental) - Macola Record Co – MRC-0946 
 "Skin Tight" (Radio Edit), "Skin Tight" (Extended Mix) / "Skin Tight" (Long Instrumental

LP
 Look At Me Now - Utopia BUL1-1823 - 1976

References

External links
  

Rock music groups from Ohio
Funk rock musical groups